Prima Facie is a one-woman play by Suzie Miller. The plot follows Tessa, a criminal defense barrister whose view of the legal system changes after she is sexually assaulted.

Plot and themes
The play is about a lawyer who specialises in defending men accused of sexual assault, and is then assaulted herself.

Themes include how witnesses in sexual assault cases are required to provide crystal-clear evidence for a conviction to be secured.

Productions

Australia
Prima Facie premiered in 2019, at the Stables Theatre in Sydney, Australia. The production, directed by Lee Lewis and starring Sheridan Harbridge, ran from 17 May to 22 June. It won the 2020 AWGIE Award for Drama and the 2020 Major AWGIE Award from the Australian Writers' Guild. This production was reprised in 2021, presented by Griffin Theatre Company and the Seymour Centre and again in 2023, at the Melbourne Theatre Company.

West End
The play made its West End premiere in 2022, at the Harold Pinter Theatre, with Jodie Comer starring as Tessa. It opened on 15 April and closed on 18 June. English singer-songwriter Self Esteem composed the soundtrack for the West End production, which she digitally released on 14 June 2022. In a review of the production, The Guardian said of the play's messages, "there is power in hearing them spoken on a West End stage, and Comer manages to infuse breath-taking emotional drama in every last word."

The West End production partnered with the Schools Consent Project, a charity that visits schools to teach about sexual consent. As part of this partnership, Prima Facie gave free tickets to school groups and raised money for the charity.

Starting 21 July 2022, a filmed performance of the play at the Harold Pinter Theatre was shown at cinemas around the world by NT Live.

The show won all three of the categories it was nominated in at the 2023 WhatsOnStage Awards: Best Play, Best Performer in a Play (for Comer) and Best Graphic Design. It received nominations in five categories of the 2023 Laurence Olivier Awards: Best New Play, Best Actress (for Comer), Best Director (for Justin Martin), Best Lighting Design (for Natasha Chivers), and Best Sound Design (for Ben and Max Ringham).

Planned Broadway production
The West End production is scheduled to play a limited engagement on Broadway in spring 2023. The show is expected to begin previews on April 11, 2023 at the Golden Theatre, with opening night set for April 23, 2023. It is scheduled to run for 10 weeks, concluding on June 18, 2023.

Soundtrack 

Self Esteem's involvement was first announced 7 February 2022. The soundtrack album was released digitally on 14 June, with a red vinyl released on 2 December. Self Esteem described her connection with the material by saying the play "deals with similar issues" as her previous album Prioritise Pleasure, and that the play is, "at heart ... an examination of what it can be like to be a woman today: the insecurities she's faced, heartbreak, sexism, misogyny, being told to look and behave a certain way." She also noted hope that her involvement would invite people to the show who otherwise feel alienated from theatre.

The Evening Standards Nick Curtis called the soundtrack "evocative" and "heartbeat-led", while The Guardians Arifa Akbar wrote that it "conjure[s] the ambient electronic sounds of an Ibiza beach bar."

Track listing

Personnel 
 Rebecca Lucy Taylor – songwriter, vocals (1-6, 8-18), producer, programmer
 Taylor Skye – producer, piano (2, 11, 17, 18), synthesiser (5, 18), songwriter (5), vocals (7)
 Cicely Balston – mastering
 Eduardo de la Paz – mixing
 Matthew Skillington – vocals (7)
 Sophie Galpin – guitar (7)

Awards

References 

2019 plays
Plays for one performer
West End plays
Australian plays